Rolf Andersson (5 October 1929 – 18 April 1997) was a Swedish footballer who played as a forward.

References

1929 births
1997 deaths
Association football forwards
Swedish footballers
Allsvenskan players
Malmö FF players